Mark Keil (born June 3, 1967) is a former professional tennis player from the United States  who won five ATP World Tour doubles tournaments and was runner up at eight more.

Early life and college
Prior to college, Keil was raised in Albuquerque and in 1985 he was the NM 4-A HS state singles champion.  Keil turned pro in the middle of his junior year (1987) from the University of South Florida.

Professional career
One of Keil's major career wins came in the second round of the 1991 Queen's Club Championships in London when he defeated Pete Sampras, then ranked 8th in the world, in straight sets. Keil went on to play in the main draw at Wimbledon in 1991 and 1993 and reached a career-high ATP singles ranking of no. 167.  He qualified and won a round in singles at the 1993 Australian Open.

Keil later carved a career for himself on the doubles tour, reaching a career-high ranking of no. 32 in 1995. He has doubles wins over Stefan Edberg, Boris Becker, Todd Martin, Tommy Haas, Andre Agassi, Gustavo Kuerten and Mark Philippoussis. He won five ATP World Tour doubles titles in his career.

He also directed and produced with Geoff Grant a film documenting life behind the scenes for a tour professional. The Journeymen follows Keil and his doubles partner Geoff Grant as they try to make a living on the doubles tour.

Family
His father, Klaus Keil, was an emeritus professor and was a research scientist at the School of Ocean and Earth Science and Technology (SOEST) at the University of Hawaii at Manoa. Asteroid 5054 Keil, and the mineral keilite are named after Klaus. He has a former touring tennis pro sister, Kathrin Keil.

Keil was married from 1999–2001 to Dr. Camilla Hildebrand.

ATP career finals

Doubles (5 titles, 8 runner-ups)

Source: ATP

References

External links
 
 

American male tennis players
American tennis coaches
Sportspeople from Honolulu
People from Mountain View, California
Tennis people from California
Tennis people from Hawaii
Living people
1967 births
American people of German descent
South Florida Bulls athletes
College men's tennis players in the United States